A list of horror films released in 1999.

References

Lists of horror films by year